The Horizon League men's basketball conference tournament is held annually at the end of the men's college basketball regular season. The tournament has been played each year since 1980.  The winner of the tournament is designated the Horizon League Tournament Champion and receives the conference's automatic bid to the NCAA men's basketball tournament.  The finals of the tournament are typically among the first held before the field for the NCAA tournament is announced.

History and tournament format
Through 2002, the entire tournament was hosted at a single venue.  From 2003 through 2015, all first-round matches were played at the home court of the higher-seeded team involved. Hosting rights for the quarterfinals and semifinals were awarded to the winner of the regular season championship.  The championship game was played at the home arena of the higher remaining seed. This format rewarded the regular-season champion and runner-up with a double-bye into the semifinals. The regular-season champion received the added benefit of home-court advantage in the semifinals, plus a home-court final if it won its semifinal.

Beginning in 2009, the Horizon League secured an entitlement sponsorship of its men's and women's basketball tournaments with Speedway SuperAmerica, a major gas and convenience store chain throughout the midwest United States, officially changing the name of the tournaments to "The Speedway Horizon League Men's/Women's Basketball Championship".

From 2016 to 2019, the Horizon League tournament was held in Detroit under a five-year deal, beginning at Joe Lewis Arena, adding the women's tournament in 2017 (with both events marketed under the title Motor City Madness), and moving to the newly-opened Little Caesars Arena beginning in 2018.

However, the contract with Detroit was ended a year early; the league reopened bidding for the men's and women's tournaments in 2018, with the new contract taking effect with the 2019–20 season. On January 25, 2019, the conference announced that Indianapolis would host the men's and women's semifinals and final from 2020 to 2022, with Indiana Farmers Coliseum as the venue. In 2022, the deal was extended through 2026.

Horizon League tournament championship game records

Notes
 Current conference members in bold.

Horizon League Tournament all-time standings

Current members
Through 2020 tournament finals

Former members

Horizon League Tournament results

Postseason appearances
Horizon League members past and present have made several Sweet 16, Elite Eight, and Final Four appearances. Charter member Loyola also won the 1963 NCAA tournament.

Current tournaments

Defunct tournaments

Broadcasters

Television

Radio

See also
List of Horizon League champions

Notes

 
Recurring sporting events established in 1980